Parallel 49 Brewing Company is a Canadian microbrewery based in Vancouver, British Columbia, Canada. Founded in 2012, the Parallel 49 Brewing Company in East Vancouver is known for brewing craft beers.

History 
Parallel 49 is co-owned by Anthony Frustagli, Nick Paladino, Mike Sleeman who also own St. Augustine’s Restaurant & Brewpub, and Scott Venema, Michael Tod and Head Brewer, Graham With, who joined them in 2012 to found the east-side brewery. In their first year of operation Parallel 49 created 30 different craft beers. The brewery's production facility, head office, and tasting room are located at the same address where the company first began brewing in 2012. The custom label artwork and graphics are created by Steve Kitchen of Combination 13.

Parallel 49's craft beers have won awards nationwide. Some of its most notable awards are for Craft Lager Munich Helles, which has won gold at the BC Beer Awards in 2015 and 2017, and gold in the "North American Style Premium Lager" category at the Canadian Brewing Awards in 2016 and 2018.

Head Brewer Graham With also founded the non-profit Vancouver home-brewers association. In 2017, Parallel 49 Brewing Company opened their new Tasting Room, Beer Store and Street Kitchen Restaurant. These new additions include 40 beers on tap, indoor and outdoor seating and feature a street style-inspired menu curated by Julianna Holt.

Location and operations 
The Parallel 49 Brewing Company headquarters is located in East Vancouver. The brewery includes Parallel 49's tasting room and restaurant which features up to 40 taps of craft beer, a full kitchen inside of a stationary food truck, and a beer store with 20 taps that accommodates growler refills. In early 2017, the tasting room was renovated and expanded to include a patio and full-service restaurant, offering weekend brunch and a street food-inspired menu.

Merchandise is sold in the brewery's tasting room, as well as on their online store that was opened in early 2018.

Products
The brewery's year-round offerings include its Craft Lager, Filthy Dirty IPA, Ruby Tears Northwest Red Ale, Jerkface 9000 Wheat Ale, Tricycle Grapefruit Radler, Trash Panda Hazy IPA and Hillbilly Ninja Hazy Pale Ale.

Seasonals

Bodhisattva Dry-Hopped Sour
Dumb Funk Brett IPA
Rock the Bells Cranberry Sour Ale
Old Boy Brown Ale
Salty Scot Salted Caramel Scotch Ale
Tricycle Lemon Radler
Snap Cracle Hop Imperial Rice IPA
Ugly Sweater Milk Stout
Sahti Claws Finnish Sahti
Toques of Hazzard Imperial White IPA
Apricotopus Apricot Sour
Schadenfreude Pumpkin Lager
Lost Souls Chocolate Pumpkin Porter
Hopnotist One Hop IPA
¡Órale! Tequila Gose
Corn Hops Imperial Corn IPA
N2 Milk Stout

N2 Extra Special Bitter
Hoparazzi West Coast Lager
Vow of Silence Belgian Strong
Hay Fever Saison
Black Hops Cascadian Dark Larger
Sun of Hop Belgian Pale Ale
Crane Kick Sorachi Ace Pilsner
Pound Sterling Fresh Hopped Pilsner
Banana Hammock Hefeweizen
Black Christmas Dark Ale
Lil' Red Sour Cherry Berliner Weisse
Bubblie's Brew Jelly Doughnut Strong Ale
Rye the Longface Imperial Rye IPA
Seedspitter Watermelon Wit
Mr. Needles Fir Pale Ale
187 On An Undercover Hop Imperial IPA.

See also
List of breweries in Canada

References

External links
 

Beer brewing companies based in British Columbia
Food and drink companies based in Vancouver
Manufacturing companies based in Vancouver